Weekend Playlist is a South Korean variety show program on tvN starring Jang Yoon-ju, Kim Sook, Ra Mi-ran and Lee Se-young.

It is air on tvN starting from September 30, 2018. It is broadcast by tvN on Sundays at 18:10 (KST).

Synopsis 
This variety program introduces popular places to go and fun things to do on weekends. This is to give the viewers who are always troubled during weekend as of where to go some options to head to during their weekends.

List of Episodes

Season 1

Ratings

Season 1 (2018–2019) 

 Ratings listed below are the individual corner ratings of Weekend Playlist. (Note: Individual corner ratings do not include commercial time, which regular ratings include.)

Notes

References

External links 
 

2018 South Korean television series debuts
Korean-language television shows
South Korean variety television shows
TVN (South Korean TV channel) original programming
South Korean reality television series
2019 South Korean television series endings